North Tyrone may refer to:

The northern part of County Tyrone
North Tyrone (Northern Ireland Parliament constituency)
North Tyrone (UK Parliament constituency)